The Speeton Clay Formation (SpC) is a Lower Cretaceous geological formation in Yorkshire, northern England. Unlike the contemporaneous terrestrial Wealden Group to the south, the Speeton Clay was deposited in marine conditions. The most common fossils in the unit are belemnites, followed by ammonites and the lobster Meyeria ornata. Dinosaur remains are among the fossils that have been recovered from the formation, although none have yet been referred to a specific genus.

The formation is named after the village of Speeton in North Yorkshire.

Fossil content 
The following fossils have been reported from the formation:
 Reptiles
 Ichthyosaurs
 Acamptonectes densus
 Neornithischians
 Owenodon hoggii
 Iguanodontia indet.
 Sauropterygians
 Elasmosauridae - "Speeton Clay plesiosaurian"
 Fish
 Cretorectolobus doylei
 "Dasyatis" speetonensis
 Notidanodon lanceolatus
 Notorhynchus aptiensis
 Synechodus dubrisiensis
 Spathobatis rugosus
 ?Sphenodus sp.
 "Elops" neocomiensis
 Pycnodontidae indet.
 Semionotidae indet.
 Teleostei indet.
 ?Triakidae indet.
 Invertebrates
 Crustaceans
 Martillepas auriculum
 Crinoids
 Crinoidea indet.

See also 
 List of dinosaur-bearing rock formations
 List of stratigraphic units with indeterminate dinosaur fossils

References

Bibliography

Further reading 

 
 

Geologic formations of England
Lower Cretaceous Series of Europe
Cretaceous England
Berriasian Stage
Valanginian Stage
Hauterivian Stage
Barremian Stage
Aptian Stage
Albian Stage
Shale formations
Shallow marine deposits
Fossiliferous stratigraphic units of Europe
Paleontology in England
Geology of Yorkshire